Cao Wenxuan (born May 1934) is a Chinese ichthyologist, a former researcher and doctoral supervisor at the Institute of Hydrobiology, Chinese Academy of Sciences (CAS).

Biography
Cao was born in Pengzhou, Sichuan in May 1934. In September 1951, he was accepted to Sichuan University, where he majored in animal science at the Department of Biology. After graduating in July 1955, he was assigned to the Institute of Hydrobiology, Chinese Academy of Sciences (CAS).

He was a member of the 8th and 9th National Committee of the Chinese People's Political Consultative Conference. He was a delegate to the 10th National People's Congress.

Honours and awards
 December 1997 Academician of the Chinese Academy of Sciences (CAS)
 State Natural Science Award (First Class and Second Class)

References

External links
 Cao Wenxuan on the Chinese Academy of Sciences (CAS) 

1934 births
People from Pengzhou
Living people
Sichuan University alumni
Chinese ichthyologists
Members of the Chinese Academy of Sciences
Delegates to the 10th National People's Congress
Members of the 8th Chinese People's Political Consultative Conference
Members of the 9th Chinese People's Political Consultative Conference